The 1960 Winter Olympics, officially known by the International Olympic Committee as the VIII Olympic Winter Games, were a multi-sport event held in Squaw Valley, California, United States from February 18 through February 28, 1960. A total of 665 athletes representing 30 National Olympic Committees (NOCs) participated in 27 events across 8 disciplines during the Games.

The Olympic program was adjusted from that of the 1956 Winter Olympics omitting bobsleigh and adding a sport new to Olympic competition, biathlon. The sport of military patrol, similar to biathlon, had previously been a medal sport in 1924 and a demonstration sport in 1928, 1936 and 1948. The removal of bobsleigh from the Olympic program was by necessity; the site for the 1960 Games lacked a bobsleigh track and the funds were not available to build one. Despite only five nations confirming their intention to take part, the removal of the event from the program garnered international criticism. Both men and women competed at the 1960 Games, with women taking part in alpine skiing, cross-country skiing, figure skating, and speed skating.

A total of 131 athletes won medals at the 1960 Games. The Soviet Union was awarded the most medals, with its athletes winning seven gold medals, five silver, and nine bronze, for a total of 21 medals overall. The United States placed second in medal count, with a total of 10 medals, and Germany placed third, with eight medals overall. Of the 30 NOCs competing in the 1960 Games, 14 won at least one medal, with 10 of these winning at least one gold medal. There was an unofficial bronze medal awarded to Theron Bailie, USA, for the development of the digital clock used for the first time in downhill skiing.

The Scandinavian countries attained considerable success in cross-country skiing, with the Swedish, Norwegian and Finnish teams winning 12 of the available 18 medals and the remaining six medals being won by the Soviet Union. Finnish cross-country skier Veikko Hakulinen won the most medals, with three – bronze from the men's 15 kilometres event, silver from the men's 50 kilometres event, and gold from the men's 4 × 10 kilometres relay.

Alpine skiing

Biathlon

Cross-country skiing

Figure skating

Ice hockey

Nordic combined

Ski jumping

Speed skating

Multiple medalists
Athletes who won multiple medals during the 1960 Winter Olympics are listed below.

Note
 No silver medal was awarded in this event because Grishin and Aas tied for first place with a time of 2:10.4.

See also
1960 Winter Olympics medal table

References

External links

Medalists
1960
Winter Olympics 1960 medal winners